Low Profile was an American hip hop duo from Los Angeles. The group consisted of rapper William "W.C." Calhoun Jr. and record producer Alphonso "D.J. Aladdin" Henderson, who went on to pursue a career in visual arts. The duo made its debut with  Records, on a compilation album produced by Ice-T and Afrika Islam, before becoming a duo on Priority Records.The group was a short-lived but influential West Coast hip hop duo. Together, they released only one album, We're in This Together. They also appeared on the Rhyme Syndicate compilation Rhyme Syndicate Comin' Through. DJ Aladdin began working with Ice-T, and WC formed a group called WC and the Maad Circle which included a then-unknown rapper named Coolio.

Discography
Studio album
1990 – We're in This Together (#66 on the Top R&B/Hip-Hop Albums)
Singles
1987 – "Hip Hop I Crave" 
1989 – "Pay Ya Dues" (#8 on the Hot Rap Songs) 
1990 – "Funky Song" (#87 on the Hot R&B/Hip-Hop Songs)

References

External links
 Low Profile at Discogs.
DJ Aladdin Interview NAMM Oral History Library (2020)

Hip hop groups from California
Musical groups from Los Angeles
African-American musical groups
American musical duos
Hip hop duos
Musical groups established in 1987
Musical groups disestablished in 1990